Muriel Teresa Wright (October 27, 1918 – March 6, 2005) was an American actress. She was nominated twice for the Academy Award for Best Supporting Actress: in 1941 for her debut work in The Little Foxes, and in 1942 for Mrs. Miniver, winning for the latter. That same year, she received a nomination for the Academy Award for Best Actress for her performance in The Pride of the Yankees, opposite Gary Cooper. She is also known for her performances in Alfred Hitchcock's Shadow of a Doubt (1943) and William Wyler's The Best Years of Our Lives (1946).

Wright received three Emmy Award nominations for her performances in the Playhouse 90 original television version of The Miracle Worker (1957), in the Breck Sunday Showcase feature The Margaret Bourke-White Story, and in the CBS drama series Dolphin Cove (1989). She earned the acclaim of top film directors, including William Wyler, who called her the most promising actress he had directed, and Alfred Hitchcock, who admired her thorough preparation and quiet professionalism.

Early life
Muriel Teresa Wright was born on October 27, 1918, in Harlem, New York City, the daughter of Martha Espy and Arthur Hendricksen Wright, an insurance agent. Her parents separated when she was young. She grew up in Maplewood, New Jersey, where she attended Columbia High School. After seeing Helen Hayes star in Victoria Regina at the Broadhurst Theatre in New York City in 1936, Wright took an interest in acting and began playing leading roles in school plays.

She earned a scholarship to the Wharf Theater in Provincetown, Massachusetts, where she was an apprentice for two summers. Following her high school graduation in 1938, she went to New York, shortened her name to "Teresa Wright", and was hired as understudy to Dorothy McGuire and Martha Scott for the role of Emily in Thornton Wilder's stage production of Our Town at Henry Miller's Theatre. She took over the role when Scott left for Hollywood to film the on-screen version of the play.

Acting career

In autumn 1939, Wright began a two-year appearance in the stage play Life with Father, playing the role of Mary Skinner. It was there that she was discovered by Samuel Goldwyn, who came to see her in the show she had been appearing in for almost a year. Goldwyn would later recall his first encounter with her backstage:

Goldwyn immediately hired the young actress for the role of Bette Davis' daughter in the 1941 adaptation of Lillian Hellman's The Little Foxes, signing her to a five-year Hollywood contract with the Goldwyn Studios. Asserting her seriousness as an actress, Wright insisted her contract contain unique clauses by Hollywood standards:

In 1941, Wright was nominated for the Academy Award for Best Supporting Actress for her film début in The Little Foxes. The following year, she was nominated again, this time for Best Actress for The Pride of the Yankees, in which she played opposite Gary Cooper as the wife of Lou Gehrig. The same year, she won the Academy Award for Best Supporting Actress as the daughter-in-law of Greer Garson's character in Mrs. Miniver. Wright is the first out of only nine actors who have been nominated in both categories in the same year. Her three Academy Award nominations and one Academy Award in her first three films is unique. She remains the only performer to have received Academy Award nominations for her first three films.

In 1943, Wright appeared in the acclaimed Universal film Shadow of a Doubt, directed by Alfred Hitchcock, playing a young woman who discovers her beloved uncle (played by Joseph Cotten) is a serial murderer. Hitchcock thought Wright was one of the more intelligent actors he had worked with, and through his direction brought out her vivacity, warmth, and youthful idealism—characteristics uncommon in Hitchcock's heroines. In 1946, Wright delivered another notable performance in William Wyler's The Best Years of Our Lives, an award-winning film about the adjustments of servicemen returning home after World War II. Critic James Agee praised her performance in The Nation:

Four years later, she would appear in another story of war veterans, Fred Zinnemann's The Men (1950), which starred Marlon Brando in his film debut. In 1947, Wright appeared in the western Pursued opposite Robert Mitchum. The moody "Freudian western" was written by her first husband Niven Busch. The following year, she starred in Enchantment, a story of two generations of lovers in parallel romances. Wright received glowing reviews for her performance. Newsweek commented: "Miss Wright, one of the screen's finest, glows as the Cinderella who captivated three men." And The New York Times concluded: "Teresa Wright plays with that breathless, bright-eyed rapture which she so remarkably commands."

In December 1948, after rebelling against the studio system that brought her fame, Teresa Wright had a public falling out with Samuel Goldwyn, which resulted in the cancellation of Wright's contract with his studio. In a statement published in The New York Times, Goldwyn cited as reasons her refusal to publicize the film Enchantment, and her being "uncooperative" and refusing to "follow reasonable instructions". In her written response, Wright denied Goldwyn's charges and expressed no regret over losing her $5,000 per week contract.

Years later, in an interview with The New York Post, Wright recalled: "I was going to be Joan of Arc, and all I proved was that I was an actress who would work for less money." For her next film, The Men (1950), instead of the $125,000 she had once commanded, she received $20,000.

In the 1950s, Wright appeared in several unsuccessful films, including The Capture (1950), Something to Live For (1952), California Conquest (1952), The Steel Trap (1952), Count the Hours (1953), The Actress (1953), and Track of the Cat (1954), opposite Robert Mitchum again. Despite the poor box-office showing of these films, Wright was usually praised for her performances. Toward the end of the decade, Wright began to work more frequently in television and theatre. She received Emmy Award nominations for her performances in the Playhouse 90 original television version of The Miracle Worker (1957) and in the Breck Sunday Showcase feature The Margaret Bourke-White Story (1960). In 1955 she played Doris Walker in The 20th Century-Fox Hour remake of the 1947 movie Miracle on 34th Street, opposite MacDonald Carey and Thomas Mitchell.

On February 8, 1960, Wright was inducted to the Hollywood Walk of Fame with two stars: one for motion pictures at 1658 Vine Street and one for television at 6405 Hollywood Boulevard.

In the 1960s, Wright returned to the New York stage appearing in three plays: Mary, Mary (1962) at the Helen Hayes Theatre in the role of Mary McKellaway, I Never Sang for My Father (1968) at the Longacre Theatre in the role of Alice, and Who's Happy Now? (1969) at the Village South Theatre in the role of Mary Hallen. During this period, she toured throughout the United States in stage productions of Mary, Mary (1962), Tchin-Tchin (1963) in the role of Pamela Pew-Picket, and The Locksmith (1965) in the role of Katherine Butler Hathaway. In addition to her stage work, Wright made numerous television appearances throughout the decade, including episodes for The Alfred Hitchcock Hour (1964) on CBS, Bonanza (1964) on NBC, The Defenders (1964, 1965) on CBS, and CBS Playhouse (1969).
 
In 1975, Wright appeared in the Broadway revival of Death of a Salesman, and in 1980, appeared in the revival of Morning's at Seven, for which she won a Drama Desk Award as a member of the Outstanding Ensemble Performance. In 1989, she received her third Emmy Award nomination for her performance in the CBS drama series Dolphin Cove. She also appeared in Murder, She Wrote in the episode "Mr. Penroy's Vacation". Her last television role was in an episode of the CBS drama series Picket Fences in 1996.

Wright's later film appearances included a major role in Somewhere in Time (1980), the grandmother in The Good Mother (1988) with Diane Keaton, and her final role as Miss Birdie in John Grisham's The Rainmaker (1997), directed by Francis Ford Coppola.

Personal life
Wright was married to writer Niven Busch from 1942 to 1952. They had two children: a son, Niven Terence Busch, born December 2, 1944; and a daughter, Mary-Kelly Busch, born September 12, 1947. She married playwright Robert Anderson in 1959. They divorced in 1978, but maintained a close relationship until the end of her life.

In her last decade, Wright lived quietly in her New England home in the town of Bridgewater, Connecticut, in Litchfield County, appearing occasionally at film festivals and forums and at events associated with the New York Yankees. In 1996, she reminisced about Alfred Hitchcock at the Edinburgh International Film Festival, and in 2003, she appeared on the Academy Awards show in a segment honoring previous Oscar-winners.

Her daughter, Mary-Kelly, is an author of books for children and young adults. Wright has two grandchildren, one of whom, Jonah Smith, co-produced Darren Aronofsky's films Pi (1998) and Requiem for a Dream (2000). In 1998, Smith accompanied Wright on her first visit to Yankee Stadium when she was invited to throw the ceremonial first pitch. Her appearance in Pride of the Yankees had sparked an interest in baseball and led her to become a Yankees fan.

Death and legacy
Teresa Wright died on March 6, 2005, of a heart attack at Yale-New Haven Hospital in Connecticut at the age of 86. She is buried in Evergreen Cemetery in New Haven.

When the roll call of former Yankees who had died was announced at Old Timer's Day on July 5, 2005, Wright's name was read among the ballplayers and members of the Yankees family.

A Girl's Got to Breathe: The Life of Teresa Wright by Donald Spoto was published in February 2016. Spoto was a close friend to Wright for more than 30 years and was given exclusive access by her family to her papers and correspondence. Publishers Weekly called the biography "an engaging and intimate portrait". Library Journal praised the book as "an affectionate tribute to a shamefully neglected talent".

Filmography

References

Citations

Sources

External links

 
 
 
 
 

1918 births
2005 deaths
20th-century American actresses
Actresses from New Jersey
American film actresses
American stage actresses
American television actresses
Best Supporting Actress Academy Award winners
Burials in Connecticut
Columbia High School (New Jersey) alumni
People from Maplewood, New Jersey
Actresses from New York City
People from Bridgewater, Connecticut
21st-century American women